Meera Madhava Raghava is a 2007 Indian Kannada language film directed by T. N. Seetharam starring Ramya, Diganth and Tilak Shekar.

Plot 
Meera (Ramya) a singer and Madhava (Diganth) a lecturer get married. Meera sacrifices her dream of becoming a big singer to support her husband who dreams to be an IAS officer. She is forced to borrow money from a rowdy Raghava (Tilak), who wanted to marry her. Meera forges her husband's signature to get money from Raghava. Time flies by and Madhava becomes a sincere IAS officer targeting corrupt elements of the society. This brings him in direct conflict with Raghava, who wants to contest elections. It is payback time for Meera with consequences being too harsh for her to handle. How she faces everything and becomes a winner forms the rest of the story.

Cast
 Ramya as Meera 
 Diganth as Madhava
 Tilak Shekar as Raghava
 Sudha Belawadi
 Sundar Raj
 Mandya Ramesh
 Master Anand

Soundtrack

Reception 
The film, though well received by the critics, did not perform well at the box-office.

References

External links 
 

2007 films
2000s Kannada-language films
Films scored by Hamsalekha
Films directed by T. N. Seetharam